Paratoxodera meggitti is a species of praying mantis found in southern China, Myanmar, West Malaysia, and Borneo''.

See also
List of mantis genera and species

References

Mantidae
Mantodea of Asia
Insects of Myanmar
Insects of China
Insects described in 1927